Skorogoszcz  (German Schurgast) is a village in the administrative district of Gmina Lewin Brzeski, within Brzeg County, Opole Voivodeship, in south-western Poland.

The village has a population of 1,200.

History
The village was first mentioned in a document of the Diocese of Wrocław from 1223 under the Latinized Polish name Scorogostow. In a document of Duke Casimir I of Opole from 1228 it was mentioned as a village located on Polish law. It was granted town rights in 1271, which it eventually lost in 1945. It was part of Piast-ruled Poland, and later on, it was also part of Bohemia (Czechia), Prussia and Germany. During World War II, the Germans operated the E778 forced labour subcamp of the Stalag VIII-B/344 prisoner-of-war camp in the town. Skorogoszcz was restored to Poland after the defeat of Nazi Germany in the war in 1945.

A new cable-stayed bridge was built in Skorogoszcz in 2004–2005.

Transport
Skorogoszcz is located on the Polish National Road No. 94, which connects Zgorzelec at the Poland–Germany border in the west with Korczowa at the Poland–Ukraine border in the east.

Sports
The local football club is LZS Skorogoszcz. It competes in the lower leagues.

References

External links 
 Jewish Community in Skorogoszcz on Virtual Shtetl

Skorogoszcz